is a Japanese singer and idol. She is a former member of the idol group HKT48.

Biography 
In 2011, Tashima took part in the 10th generation auditions for the idol group Morning Musume. She passed 3 rounds and advanced to the final, but was not chosen to join the group.

In 2012, the idol group HKT48 held its 2nd generation audition. Tashima participated and passed. She was added to the group as trainee member along with 33 other winners of the audition. She became soon a hot topic throughout Japan, after it was reported that AKB48 and HKT48 producer Yasushi Akimoto commented on her as being "the new Jurina Matsui", a member who joined AKB48's sister group SKE48 at the age of 11 and was immediately appointed one of the front positions in the next AKB48 single and featured on its cover art. Thus she became one of the most prominent members of the project in a matter of months.

Another surprise came when Tashima, in spite of officially being a trainee member, was appointed the central position in her band's first original song "Hatsukoi Butterfly", to be released as a B-side on the 29th single by AKB48.

In February 2013 it was announced that HKT48 will release its debut single, titled "Suki! Suki! Skip!", and that Tashima, again, was going to hold the central position in the title song.

In HKT48's second single "Melon Juice", Meru Tashima was again featured in a central position. This time there were two "centers", her and Mio Tomonaga.

In November 2019, Tashima acted in Battles Without Honor and Humanity: On'na-tachi no Shitō-hen, a stage adaptation of the Battles Without Honor and Humanity yakuza film series. She played the role of Yoshio Yamamori, based on Nobuo Kaneko's original portrayal.

On January 15, 2022, Tashima announced her graduation from HKT48. Her graduation performance is scheduled for March 14, then she will officially graduate from the group on April 3.

Filmography

Television 
  (drama, Fuji TV, October 27, 2013 – March 16, 2014)
  (drama, Kyushu Asahi Broadcasting, March 21, 2014)
  as Megaphone (drama, Nippon Television, November 28, 2015)
  Ep.4 – First Boyfriend, as Ema Hoshina (drama, TV Asahi, April 27, 2016)

Stage
Battles Without Honor and Humanity: On'na-tachi no Shitō-hen (2019)

Film 
Sengoku Girl and Kendō Boy (2020)

Anime 
Armor Shop for Ladies & Gentlemen (2021)

References

External links 
 Meru Tashima official HKT48 profile
 Tashima Meru on 755

2000 births
Living people
HKT48
Japanese idols
Japanese women pop singers
Musicians from Fukuoka Prefecture
Universal Music Japan artists